was a Japanese manga artist and one of the first female manga artists. She started her own comic strip, Sazae-san, in 1946. It reached national circulation via the Asahi Shimbun in 1949, and ran daily until Hasegawa decided to retire in February 1974. All of her comics were printed in Japan in digest comics; by the mid-1990s, Hasegawa's estate had sold over 60 million copies in Japan alone.

Life and career 
Machiko Hasegawa was born January 30, 1920, in Taku, Saga Prefecture. When she was 15, her father died and the family moved to Tokyo, where she took up drawing cartoons. Her comics were the first to follow a consistent four-panel layout, which later became the standard.

Hasegawa never married, instead living with her older sister Mariko. Both were art collectors, and their collection is housed in the Hasegawa Machiko Art Museum. The two started the Shimaisha Publishing Company, through which 20 million paperback copies of her comics have been published. Hasegawa died of heart failure on May 27, 1992, at the age of 72. Towards the end of her life she stopped appearing in public and on television, and her death was kept a secret for 35 days after her private funeral as requested in her will.

Sazae-san

Sazae-san was a popular postwar comic strip depicting the life of Sazae-san, a fictional Japanese housewife.

The comic strip was turned into a dramatic radio series in 1955 and a weekly animated series in 1969, which is still running as of 2022.

Hasegawa was involved in a court case with a bus company's unapproved use of Sazae-san and its characters in promotional images, as well as the name of the business, "Sazae-san Tours". As a result of this case, new copyright laws were established that extended protection for fictional characters as individual identities, not just within their series of origin.

Selected comics were translated into English, under the title The Wonderful World of Sazae-san.

Awards
Hasegawa won the 8th Bungeishunjū Manga Award for Sazae-san in 1962. She was the first female manga artist to receive Japan's Medal of Honor with Purple Ribbon in 1982. She also received the 4th Tokyo Cultural Award in 1988; the Order of the Precious Crown, Fourth Class in 1990; the Minister of Education Award for Sazae-san at the 20th Japan Cartoonists Association Awards in 1991; the 10th People's Honor Award in 1992; and the Special Prize at the 24th Tezuka Osamu Cultural Prizes in 2020.

See also

 Hasegawa Machiko Art Museum

References

External links

 Timeline of her life at the Hasegawa Machiko Art Museum 
 

1920 births
1992 deaths
Women manga artists
Japanese female comics artists
Female comics writers
People from Saga Prefecture
Recipients of the Medal with Purple Ribbon
People's Honour Award winners
20th-century Japanese women writers
20th-century Japanese women artists
Manga artists from Saga Prefecture